Hewitt Peak is a  mountain summit located on the western border of Kootenay National Park, in the Canadian Rockies of British Columbia, Canada. The peak is also known locally as Mammoth Peak, and originally as Mount 10060. The alternate names derive from its outline profile resembling a mammoth, and its elevation as measured in feet. No name for this mountain has been officially adopted yet. Its nearest higher peak is Tumbling Peak,  to the north-northwest, and both are part of the Vermilion Range. Park visitors can catch a glimpse of the peak from Highway 93, also known as the Banff–Windermere Highway.

History

The first ascent of the mountain was made in 1906 by members of the Dominion Land Survey.
It was first named Mount 10060 by Kate Gardiner and party in 1933, when they climbed nearby Foster Peak and Mount 10240 (now known as Tumbling Peak). Hewitt Peak may be named for Hewitt Bostock, Martin Hewitt or James J. Hewitt.

Geology

Hewitt Peak is composed of limestone, a sedimentary rock laid down during the Precambrian to Jurassic periods. Formed in shallow seas, this sedimentary rock was pushed east and over the top of younger rock during the Laramide orogeny.

Climate

Based on the Köppen climate classification, Hewitt Peak is located in a subarctic climate zone with cold, snowy winters, and mild summers.

References

See also
Geology of the Rocky Mountains
Geography of British Columbia

External links
 Parks Canada web site: Kootenay National Park
 Climbing Hewitt Peak: by Matt Ruta
 Winter photo of Hewitt Peak: mountainsoftravelphotos.com
 Flickr photo: Hewitt Peak

Three-thousanders of British Columbia
Kootenay National Park
Canadian Rockies